The Limentra orientale (also: Limentra di Treppio) is a mountain river in Italy, a right tributary of the Reno. It rises from Monte la Croce in the Apennine Mountains. It enters the Metropolitan City of Bologna near Lentula and Treppio. It flows into the Reno after , near Riola di Vergato.

Rivers of Italy
Rivers of Tuscany
Rivers of Emilia-Romagna
Rivers of the Province of Pistoia
Rivers of the Province of Bologna